Vaux-sur-Sûre (Vaux on Sûre) is a municipality of Wallonia located in the province of Luxembourg, Belgium. 

On 1 January 2007 the municipality, which covers 135.87 km2, had 4,759 inhabitants, giving a population density of 35 inhabitants per km2.

The municipality consists of the following districts: Hompré, Juseret, Morhet, Nives, Sibret, and Vaux-lez-Rosières (town centre). Other population centers include:

See also
 List of protected heritage sites in Vaux-sur-Sûre

References

External links
 

 
Municipalities of Luxembourg (Belgium)